New Braunfels High School (commonly referred to as NBHS) is a public high school in New Braunfels, Texas, United States, that was established in 1845. Up until 2008, New Braunfels was one of the largest 4A high schools in Texas and is classified as a 6A school by the University Interscholastic League (UIL) as of 2016. In 2015, the school was rated "Met Standard" by the Texas Education Agency.

Academics
In 2014-2015, New Braunfels High School students scored an average of 1023 (on the critical reading and math sections) on the SAT college admissions test. This is above the state and national averages, which are 956 and 1006 respectively.

Demographics
The demographic breakdown in 2020-21 was:
Male - 50%
Female - 50%
Native American/Alaskan - 0.5%
Asian - 1%
Black - 2.5%
Hispanic - 43%
White - 51%
Multiracial - 2%

29.9% of the students were eligible for free or reduced lunch.

Athletics
The New Braunfels Unicorns compete in the following sports:

 Baseball
 Basketball
 Cross Country
 Football
 Golf
Marching Band
 Powerlifting
 Soccer
 Softball
 Swimming and Diving
 Tennis
 Track & Field
 Volleyball
 Wrestling

State titles
Baseball 
2006 (4A)
Girls Bowling
2003 & 2007
Girls Cross County 
1993 (4A), 1994 (4A), 1995 (4A)
Boys Soccer 
1994 (All)
Team Tennis 
2007 (4A), 2008 (5A), 2009 (5A), 2010 (5A), 2011 (5A), 2012 (5A), 2013 (5A), 2015 (6A)
Girls Track 
1996 (4A)
Volleyball 
2000 (4A), 2005 (4A)

Notable alumni
 Nell Fortner, U.S. Olympic and college Women's Basketball coach
 Kliff Kingsbury, football coach
 James Langabeer, scientist and academic
 Leigh Nash, lead singer of Sixpence None the Richer
 George E. Nowotny, former Arkansas politician and  businessman
 Marja Tiura, Finnish politician 
 Devin Patrick Kelley, mass murder, committed Sutherland Springs church shooting
 Jordan Westburg, professional baseball shortstop
 Damien Roberts, South African former professional tennis player
 Geoff Hangartner, former American football guard

References

External links 
 

Educational institutions established in 1845
High schools in Comal County, Texas
Public high schools in Texas
1845 establishments in the Republic of Texas
New Braunfels, Texas